The Moon and the Sledgehammer is a British 1971 cult documentary film directed by Philip Trevelyan and produced by Jimmy Vaughan which documents the eccentric lives of the Page family, consisting of the elderly Mr Page and his adult children Jim, Pete, Nancy and Kath, who live in a wood in Swanbrook, near Chiddingly, Sussex without mains gas, mains electricity or running water. The sons find employment by fixing mechanical things as odd jobs and maintain two traction engines.

The film, which is 65 minutes long, consists of interviews with the Page family, interspersed with footage of them going about their lives in the forest. It was shot using natural light on 16mm colour film. The sound is mono and there is no voice-over narration.

The film was previewed at the 1971 Berlin International Film Festival, and the first reviews were in the West German press.  The British press subsequently picked it up resulting in short positive reviews by John Russell Taylor, David Robinson, George Melly, Dilys Powell.  After its distribution it was also positively reviewed by Philip Oakes.

In 2009 the film was released on DVD for the first time. To coincide with this it had showings at various cinemas. A reunion of the director and crew and a question and answer session was held at the London showing. This forms the basis for a companion DVD, Behind the Moon and the Sledgehammer, directed by Katy MacMillan—a documentary film about a documentary film. This also features film directors Nick Broomfield, Molly Dineen, Andrew Kotting and Ben Rivers and film historian John Russell Taylor discussing the film and its influence.

As part of the re-release, it also had other reviews written of it.

Recording under the name Wyrdstone, Clive Murrell uses a sample of audio from the documentary as the intro to his track Pucelancyrcan, an Anglo-Saxon name for Purchase Wood in the Parish of Brightlington East Sussex. The track first appeared on the compilation album Wierdlore: Notes from the folk underground, released by Folk Police Recordings, and subsequently on Potemkin Village Fayre, a Wyrdstone album.

References

External links 
 
 

1971 films
British documentary films
1971 documentary films
Documentary films about families
Simple living
Films shot in 16 mm film
1970s English-language films
1970s British films